Robinson Aponzá (born 11 April 1989) is a Colombian professional footballer who plays as attacking midfielder for Municipal Limeño.

Honours

Club 
Deportes Tolima
 Copa Colombia (1): 2014

Individual
 Peruvian Primera División top scorer: 2016 Torneo Descentralizado

External links 
 

1989 births
Living people
Colombian footballers
Colombian expatriate footballers
Association football midfielders
Categoría Primera A players
Categoría Primera B players
Peruvian Primera División players
Atlético Bucaramanga footballers
Alianza Atlético footballers
Deportes Tolima footballers
Cortuluá footballers
América de Cali footballers
Atlético Huila footballers
Club Olimpia footballers
Águilas Doradas Rionegro players
Atlético Junior footballers
Sport Rosario footballers
Millonarios F.C. players
Jaguares de Córdoba footballers
Alianza Universidad footballers
Santos de Nasca players
Colombian expatriate sportspeople in Paraguay
Colombian expatriate sportspeople in Mexico
Colombian expatriate sportspeople in Peru
Colombian expatriate sportspeople in El Salvador
Expatriate footballers in Paraguay
Expatriate footballers in Mexico
Expatriate footballers in Peru
Expatriate footballers in El Salvador
Sportspeople from Cauca Department